Tim Agbaje (born May 16, 1990) is a Canadian football defensive lineman who is currently a free agent. He was signed as an undrafted free agent by the Saskatchewan Roughriders on May 27, 2015. He first played CJFL for the Edmonton Wildcats for five seasons before playing CIS football for the Saskatchewan Huskies from 2013 to 2014.

References

External links
Saskatchewan Roughriders profile 

1990 births
Living people
Players of Canadian football from Alberta
Canadian football defensive linemen
Saskatchewan Huskies football players
Saskatchewan Roughriders players
Canadian football people from Edmonton